CMH Mosque Jhelum or Divisional Headquarters Mosque is a Jamia Mosque in Jhelum City, Punjab Province, Pakistan.

This mosque is adjacent to the Combined Military Hospital, Jhelum. Its foundation was laid by General Muhammad Ayub Khan on 21 March 1950 and opening ceremony was headed by Governor of Punjab Sardar Abdur Rab Nishtar. It has a capacity to hold more than 25,000 people at a time.

See also
 Jhelum

References

1950 establishments in Pakistan
Mosques in Jhelum
Mosques completed in 1950